Hoboken is a southern district of the arrondissement and city of Antwerp, in the Flemish Region of Belgium. It is located at the Scheldt river. The name of the district has its origins in Middle Dutch.

Name 
The name Hoboken is derived from Medieval Dutch Hooghe Buechen or Hoge Beuken, meaning High or Tall Beeches. To this day there is a hospital in Hoboken named "Hoge Beuken".

A local children's story says that the name "Hoboken" is derived from a little boy who accidentally dropped his sandwich in the Schelde river, which flows near Hoboken. In the local dialect of Dutch, a "boke" is a sandwich and "ho" is a way of shouting "stop", so he must have shouted "Ho, boken!!!".

History 

The first historical records of Hoboken date from the 1135 parish of capellam de hobuechen qua libam. At that time Hoboken was part of Wilrijk, in the Duchy of Brabant. It has since then evolved from a small village to an industrialized district of Antwerp.

From the 13th to the 15th century the fiefdom of Hoboken was the property of the Lords of the lands of Rumst: Perwijs, Counts of Vianden, Count of Flanders, House of Luxembourg and House of Orange-Nassau. In 1559 William of Orange sold the lands of Rumst and Hoboken to Melchior Schetz (the new Lord of Hoboken).

In 1579 the city of Antwerp joined the Union of Utrecht and became the capital of the Dutch Revolt. In 1585, Alessandro Farnese, Duke of Parma and Piacenza, captured Antwerp after a long siege. During the siege of Antwerp, Hoboken was partly flooded and was raided by enemy soldiers. As part of the terms of surrender of Antwerp, its Protestant citizens were given four years to settle their affairs before quitting the city. Most settlers went to the Republic of the Seven United Netherlands (the unoccupied part of the Union of Utrecht) in the north, starting the Dutch Golden Age. Antwerp's banking was controlled for a generation by Genoa, and Amsterdam became the new trading centre of the region—the population of Amsterdam went from 30.000 in 1570 to 60.000 in 1600 and the Amsterdam Canal District was constructed to accommodate the traders and bankers from Antwerp (including much of its Jewish population).

Many of the early American settlers were refugees from Antwerp and the Southern Netherlands. The first settlers in New York were Belgians (Flemish Dutch and Walloons), they came to New York in 1623 (Michael Pauw, from Ghent and Peter Minuit from Tournai) and founded settlements at Wallabout, Long Island, Staten Island, Hoboken and Pavonia. A consul of the "Low Countries" in London Emanuel van Meteren, born in Antwerp, induced Henry Hudson to go meet with the famed cartographer Petrus Plancius (from Ypres) in Amsterdam and to support the search for a northeastern passage to India. Willem Usselincx, the founding father of the Dutch West India Company and the settlement of New Sweden was also a merchant from Antwerp.

In 1617 the descendants of Lord Schetz (of Hoboken) were called baron and were from then on to be known as the House of Ursel, in 1683 they carried the title of count and in 1717 duke d' Ursel.

A turning point in the history of Hoboken was the construction of the Cockerill shipyard in 1873.

During World War I, Antwerp became the fallback point of the Belgian Army after the defeat at the Battle of Liège. The Siege of Antwerp lasted for 11 days, the city was taken by the German Army after heavy fighting, and the Belgians were forced to retreat westwards. Fort 8, one of the forts defending Antwerp located in the south of Hoboken, was of not much use during WWI, it was built in 1864 and was terribly outdated. Antwerp remained under German control until the Armistice of 11 November 1918.

On 1 January 1983, Hoboken became a district of the city of Antwerp.

Culture 
Hoboken boasts an annual 5K beer server race. The tradition started, according to legend, in 1777, with the proclamation of the United States of Belgium ( or Verenigde Belgische Staten). The race is held annually on the first Sunday of November and is often amalgamated by the All Hallows' Day celebration.

Geography 
The main neighbourhoods in Hoboken are:

East of railway line 52

 Hoboken-centre
 Hertog van Brabantwijk
 Vogeltjeswijk
 Zwaantjes

West of railway line 52

 Moretusburg
 Hertogvelden
 Polderstad

Demographics

19th century

20th century

21st century

References

External links 

Districts of Antwerp
Populated places in Antwerp Province